is a Japanese idol, singer and actor. He is a member of the Johnny's boyband Kis-My-Ft2 and has acted in multiple high-profile television and film productions.

Discography 
 For Yuta Tamamori's discography as a member of Kis-My-Ft2, see Kis-My-Ft2#Discography.

Filmography

Films

Television dramas

References

External links 
 Kis-My-Ft2 profile — Johnny's Net
 Kis-My-Ft2 profile — Avex
 

1990 births
Living people
Johnny & Associates
Japanese idols
Japanese male pop singers
21st-century Japanese male actors
Singers from Tokyo
21st-century Japanese singers
21st-century Japanese male singers